Puzyrevo, or Puzyryovo, is the name of several rural localities in Russia.

Modern localities
Puzyrevo, Arkhangelsk Oblast, a village in Pavlovsky Selsoviet of Vilegodsky District in Arkhangelsk Oblast
Puzyrevo, Novgorod Oblast, a village in Turbinnoye Settlement of Okulovsky District in Novgorod Oblast
Puzyrevo, Pytalovsky District, Pskov Oblast, a village in Pytalovsky District of Pskov Oblast
Puzyrevo, Sebezhsky District, Pskov Oblast, a village in Sebezhsky District of Pskov Oblast
Puzyrevo, Smolensk Oblast, a village in Dobroselskoye Rural Settlement of Monastyrshchinsky District in Smolensk Oblast
Puzyrevo, Tver Oblast, a village in Liskovskoye Rural Settlement of Kesovogorsky District in Tver Oblast

Abolished localities
Puzyrevo, Kostroma Oblast, a village in Potrusovsky Selsoviet of Parfenyevsky District in Kostroma Oblast; abolished on October 18, 2004

References

Notes

Sources